Harinagar is a suburb of Thrissur town in Thrissur district, Kerala, south India. It is 3 km from the centre of the town (Swaraj Round). Harinagar housing colony is one of the largest colony in the town and the commercial and residential area of Poonkunnam. There are so many streets in this colony by which each house is known like Harinagar 4th street. Harinagar colony is surrounded by some of the famous Hindu Temples in the district like, Poonkunnam Siva Temple, Poonkunnam Seetha Ramaswamy Temple and Kuttankulangara Sri Krishna Temple.

Satellite image
 Satellite image of Harinagar

Cities and towns in Thrissur district